Countess of Courtown is the title given to the wife of the Earl of Courtown. Women who have held the title include:

Mary Stopford, Countess of Courtown (died 1810)
Mary Stopford, Countess of Courtown (died 1823)